Arthur Georges Joel Mamou-Mani, AAdip ARB/RIBA FRSA (born 5 February 1983 in Paris) is a French architect. Mamou-Mani is director of the architecture and design practice Mamou-Mani Ltd which specializes in a new kind of pop-up, digital fabrication led architecture.

Biography

Family 
He is the nephew of Guy Mamou-Mani, the brother of Mathias Mamou-Mani, co-founder of Dynamic Beta Investments, the son of Éditions Albin Michel press officer Chantal Pottier and Alain Mamou-Mani, who wrote Beyond profit.

Formation 
He studied at the École nationale supérieure d'architecture de Paris-Malaquais and in London, in 2003, at the Architectural Association School of Architecture. He then worked at Zaha Hadid Architects, Ateliers Jean Nouvel and Proctor and Matthews Architects for three years. In 2011, he started teaching Diploma Studio 10 at the University of Westminster with Toby Burgess. To allow their students to share their ideas, they both created the online platform WeWantToLearn.net receiving 600,000 views since its creation. Arthur also founded his practice Mamou-Mani ltd in 2011.

The projects include the Magic Garden for Karen Millen and the 3D Pop-Up Studio for the Xintiandi shopping mall in Shanghai, one of the first component-based, fully 3D Printed pavilion (with Andrei Jipa and Stephany Xu) Another pop-up project is "The Fitting Room" designed in collaboration with James K. Cheung of ARUP Associates a large origami tree made of 500 laser-cut polypropylene folded pieces. In March 2016, he participates with Maggie Aderin-Pocock, Toby Burgess, Linda Aitken and Els Leclerq, to a Samsung report that explores such questions as "How will we live; how will we work; how will we relax?".

Career 
He is a lecturer at the University of Westminster in London and owns a digital fabrication laboratory called the FabPub. Mamou-Mani has given speeches including the TEDx conference in the United States, the Develop3D Live Conference, and the Taipei Technical University in Taiwan. His work was featured at the Process Exhibition in Shanghai and at the Sto Werkstatt in London. He currently lives in London.

In 2018, he built the Burning Man Temple 2018, Galaxia, consisting of 20 timber truss petals converging as a spiral towards one point in the sky. He is the first non-US architect selected for this piece of art.

In 2019, he designed Conifera, a 3D-printed bioplastic installation for COS, during Milan design week, in the 16th-century Palazzo Isimbardi.

In 2022, he built the temple, Catharsis, at Burning Man.

Awards 
2013: Crown Estate's best RIBA display for "The Magic Garden" at Karen Millen's flagship store on Regent Street
2014: VM & Display best Christmas display
2016: Fellow of The Royal Society for the Encouragement of Arts, Manufactures and Commerce.
 2020: Reward Architect by Pierre Cardin Prize of l’Académie des Beaux-arts

Gallery

See also 
 3D printing
 List of TED speakers

References

External links 
Official website
Strategies Using Grasshopper®
Interview,  in the Shanghai Daily
Abitare sull'acqua, in La Repubblica
The future of Britain? floating cities and high-rise farmsy, in The Telegraph
Stackable housing pods, underwater cities, printed houses: Looking ahead at the city of the future, in WTTV
From floating cities to high rise farms: Experts outline the future of Britain's architecture, in The Independent

21st-century French architects
1983 births
Living people
Architects from Paris
Academics of the University of Westminster
3D printing specialists